André Rey (1906–1965) was a Swiss psychologist who first developed the Rey-Osterrieth Complex Figure and the Rey Auditory Verbal Learning Test. Both tests are widely used in neuropsychological assessment.
Rey was considered to be a pioneer in clinical psychology, child psychology, and neuropsychology. 
Rey is known in American neuropsychological literature for his "tests of malingering". Rey's tests of malingering include the Rey 15-Item Memory Test (RMT), the Rey Word Recognitions Test (WRT), and the Rey Dot Counting Test (DCT).

Publications
Translations of excerpts from Andre Rey"s Psychological examination of traumatic encephalopathy and P. A. Osterrieth"s The Complex Figure Copy Test, Rey, A., & Osterrieth, P. A. (1993).

References

1906 births
1965 deaths
Swiss psychologists
20th-century psychologists